The 2011–12 season was AS Monaco FC's first season back in Ligue 2 since relegation from Ligue 1 in 2011. Marco Simone took over as coach of AS Monaco in September 2011 following the sacking of Laurent Banide. They finished the season in eighth place having struggled in the relegation zone for the majority of the season. They also participated in the Coupe de France where they were eliminated at the Round of 64 stage by Angers, and the Coupe de la Ligue which they were knocked out of in the first round by Sedan.

Season review
See also 2011–12 Ligue 2

On 23 December 2011, Russian billionaire businessman Dmitry Rybolovlev bought a majority stake in AS Monaco. Rybolovlev was stated as saying "I think this club has enormous potential. I hope it can now realise this potential, both domestically and in Europe."

Squad
As of 31 January 2012.

On loan

Transfers

Summer

In:

Out:

Winter

In:

Out:

Competitions

Ligue 2

League table

Results summary

Results by round

Fixtures & results

 

Notes
The match between Angers and Monaco was postponed due to a frozen pitch.

Coupe de la Ligue

Coupe de France

Squad statistics

Appearances and goals

|-
|colspan="14"|Players who appeared for Monaco no longer at the club:

|}

Top scorers

Disciplinary record

References

External links
 2011–12 AS Monaco FC season at ESPN
2011-12 AS Monaco FC season at Soccerway

AS Monaco FC seasons
Monaco
AS Monaco
AS Monaco